Asy (Ası) is a rural locality (a village) in Lipovsky Selsoviet, Arkhangelsky District, Bashkortostan, Russia. The population was 32 as of 2010. There are 2 streets.

Geography 
Asy is located 16 km northeast of Arkhangelskoye (the district's administrative centre) by road. Kyzylyarovo is the nearest rural locality.

References 

Rural localities in Arkhangelsky District